Darnell Edwards (born November 11, 1979) is a former Canadian football free safety who played for the Saskatchewan Roughriders of the Canadian Football League.

Born in Montreal, Quebec, Edwards was drafted out of college by Saskatchewan (29th overall) in 2002.  Throughout most of his career, he shared the starting job with Jason Mallett and Scott Gordon, both Canadians.  Mallett was released after 2003, and Gordon was traded before the start of the 2006 CFL season.  He attended college at the University of Manitoba.

References

1979 births
Living people
Saskatchewan Roughriders players
Players of Canadian football from Quebec
Canadian football people from Montreal
Canadian football defensive backs
Canadian football articles in need of updating